Lomanotus is a genus of sea slugs, marine gastropod mollusks in the family Lomanotidae.

Lomanotus is the type genus of the family Lomanotidae.

Genera 
Species within the genus Lomanotus include:
 Lomanotus barlettai Garcia-Gomez, Lopez-Gonzalez & Garcia, 1990
 Lomanotus draconis Ortea & Cabrera, 1999
 Lomanotus genei Vérany, 1846
 Lomanotus marmoratus (Alder & Hancock, 1845)
 Lomanotus phiops Er. Marcus, 1957
 Lomanotus vermiformis Eliot, 1908

References

External links 

Lomanotidae